Leonard Stanford Merrifield (1880 – 25 April 1943) was a British sculptor, notable for the public monuments he created in Cornwall and in Northern Ireland.

Biography
Merrifield was born at Wyck Rissington in Gloucestershire and initially trained as a stone carver before studying at the Cheltenham School of Art. He moved to London to study at the City and Guilds of London Art School and then at the Royal Academy Schools. Throughout his career Merrifield was based in London and created statuettes and portraits busts plus a number of larger public monuments, statues and war memorials.

From 1906 to 1940 Merrifield was a regular exhibitor at the Royal Academy in London. In 1919 at the Royal Academy Exhibition of War Memorials, Merrifield showed a design of a statute of a soldier with bayonrt fixed standing in front of a Celtic cross. Merrifield was subsequently commissioned to create a version of this design for the war memorial at Burnham in Buckinghamshire. He received a gold medal from the Paris Salon in 1939 and exhibited with both the Royal Glasgow Institute of the Fine Arts and the Royal West of England Academy. He was heavily involved with the Art Workers' Guild and was elected a Fellow of the Royal Society of British Sculptors in 1926. The National Museum Wales holds a marble bust of Robert Drane (1832-1914) and a bronze Pieta by Merrifield.

Selected public works

Other works
War memorial to Young Citizen Volunteers, the Royal Irish Rifles, Belfast City Hall
Statue of Lord Craigavon, Stormont Parliament Buildings
Statue of Asquith, Palace of Westminster, London, completed by Gilbert Bayes after Merrifield's death

References

External links

 

1880 births
1943 deaths
20th-century English male artists
20th-century British sculptors
Alumni of the City and Guilds of London Art School
Alumni of the Royal Academy Schools
English male sculptors
People from Gloucestershire